The Honourable Edward Kamau Brathwaite, CHB (11 May 1930 – 4 February 2020), was a Barbadian poet and academic, widely considered one of the major voices in the Caribbean literary canon. Formerly a professor of Comparative Literature at New York University, Brathwaite was the 2006 International Winner of the Griffin Poetry Prize, for his volume of poetry Born to Slow Horses.

Brathwaite held a Ph.D. from the University of Sussex (1968) and was the co-founder of the Caribbean Artists Movement (CAM). He received both the Guggenheim and Fulbright Fellowships in 1983, and was a winner of the 1994 Neustadt International Prize for Literature, the Bussa Award, the Casa de las Américas Prize for poetry, and the 1999 Charity Randall Citation for Performance and Written Poetry from the International Poetry Forum.

Brathwaite was noted for his studies of Black cultural life both in Africa and throughout the African diasporas of the world in works such as Folk Culture of the Slaves in Jamaica (1970); The Development of Creole Society in Jamaica, 1770–1820 (1971); Contradictory Omens (1974); Afternoon of the Status Crow (1982); and History of the Voice (1984), the publication of which established him as the authority of note on nation language.

Brathwaite often made use of a combination of customized typefaces (some resembling dot matrix printing) and spelling, referred to as Sycorax video style.

Biography

Early life and education

Lawson Edward Brathwaite was born in the capital city of Bridgetown, Barbados, to Hilton and Beryl (Gill) Brathwaite. He began his secondary education in 1945 at Harrison College in Bridgetown, and while there wrote essays on jazz for a school newspaper that he started, as well as contributing articles to the literary magazine Bim. In 1949 he won the Barbados Island Scholarship to attend the University of Cambridge, where he studied English and History. 
In 1953, Brathwaite received a B.A. honours degree in History from Pembroke College, Cambridge, and he also began his association with the BBC's Caribbean Voices programme in London, where many of his poems and stories were broadcast. In 1954 he received a Diploma of Education from Pembroke College, Cambridge.

The years in Ghana

The year 1955 found Brathwaite working as an education officer in the Gold Coast with the Ministry of Education. This saw him "witness Kwame Nkrumah coming to power and Ghana becoming the first African state to gain independence, which profoundly affected his sense of Caribbean culture and identity", and he was also able to study with the musicologist J. H. Kwabena Nketia.

In 1960, while he was on home leave from Ghana, Brathwaite married Doris Monica Wellcome, a Guyanese graduate in Home Economics and Tropical Nutrition from the University of Leicester, with whom he had a son, Michael.

During his years in Ghana, Brathwaite's writing flowered, with Odale's Choice (a play) premiering at the Mfantsiman Secondary School in Cape Coast, in June 1962. A full production of the play was later taken to Accra.

Return to the Caribbean and the UK

In 1962–63, Brathwaite crossed the waters again and found himself as resident tutor in the Department of Extra-Mural Studies in St Lucia. Later in 1963, he made his journey to the University of the West Indies (UWI), Mona Campus in Kingston, Jamaica, to teach in the History Department.

In 1966, Brathwaite spearheaded, as co-founder and secretary, the organization of the Caribbean Artists Movement (CAM) from London, other key figures involved being John La Rose and Andrew Salkey.

In 1971 he launched Savacou, a journal of CAM, at the University of the West Indies (UWI), Mona Campus in Kingston, Jamaica. That same year, Brathwaite received the name Kamau from Ngugi wa Thiong'o's grandmother at Limuru, Kenya, while on a City of Nairobi Fellowship to the University of Nairobi.

His doctoral thesis from Sussex University on The Development of Creole Society in Jamaica was published in 1971 by Oxford University Press, and in 1973 he published what is generally considered his best work, The Arrivants: A New World Trilogy, comprising three earlier volumes: Rights of Passage (1967), Masks (1968) and Islands (1969). An exhaustive bibliography of his work, entitled EKB: His Published Prose & Poetry, 1948–1986 was produced by his wife, Doris Monica Brathwaite, in 1986. In response to her death later that year, Brathwaite wrote The Zea Mexican Diary: 7 September 1926 – 7 September 1986.

Brathwaite described the years from 1986 to 1990 as a "time of salt," in which he chronicled the death of his wife in 1986, the destruction of his archive in Irish Town, Jamaica, by Hurricane Gilbert in 1988, and his near-death experience as a result of a Kingston shooting in 1990.

"Maroon years" and afterwards

Kamau Brathwaite spent three self-financed "Maroon Years", 1997 to 2000, at "Cow Pasture", his now famous and, then, "post-hurricane" home in Barbados. In 1998 he married Beverly Reid, a Jamaican.

In 1992 Brathwaite took up the position of Professor of Comparative Literature at New York University, subsequently dividing his residence between Barbados and New York.

In 1994, Brathwaite was awarded the Neustadt International Prize for Literature for his body of work, nominated by Ghanaian poet and author Kofi Awoonor, edging out other nominees including; Toni Morrison, Norman Mailer, and Chinua Achebe.

In 2002 the University of Sussex presented Kamau Brathwaite with an Honorary Doctorate.

In 2004, after his retirement from New York University, Brathwaite began chronicling a Second Time of Salt, musing on what he deemed a "cultural lynching."

In 2006, he was the sole person that year to be awarded a Musgrave gold medal by the Institute of Jamaica, with eight silver and bronze medals going to other recipients. In 2010, Brathwaite reported the theft of the medal, as well as other items from his New York City home in the previous four years.

Brathwaite was Professor Emeritus of Comparative Literature at New York University and resided in Cow Pasture, Barbados.

He died aged 89 on 4 February 2020, and was accorded an official funeral on 21 February.

Posthumous recognition and legacy

Shortly before his death, Brathwaite was offered and had accepted the Bocas Henry Swanzy Award for Distinguished Service to Caribbean Letters, presented annually at the NGC Bocas Lit Fest. Announcing that the award, which recognises his contribution as a literary critic, literary activist, editor, and author on topics of Caribbean literature, as well as honouring the year of his 90th birthday, would be presented to his family in Barbados at a ceremony March, Bocas founder and director Marina Salandy-Brown said: "It now seems even more significant to honour him and, in this time of mourning, it is a small consolation to know that news of the award brought Prof Brathwaite pleasure in his final days."

On 22 October 2020, a commissioned portrait of Brathwaite, painted by Errol Lloyd, was unveiled at his alma mater Pembroke College, Cambridge.

Honours and awards 

 1970: Cholmondeley Award
 1983: Guggenheim Fellowship
 1983: Fulbright Fellowship
 1987: Order of Barbados (CHB)
 1994: Neustadt International Prize for Literature
 1999: Charity Randall Citation for Performance and Written Poetry from International Poetry Forum
 2002: Honorary doctorate, University of Sussex
 2006: Griffin Poetry Prize, International Winner
 2006: Gold Musgrave Medal for Literature from the Institute of Jamaica
 2007: President's Award, St. Martin Book Fair  
 2010: W. E. B. Du Bois Award
 2011: Casa de las Americas Premio
 2015: Robert Frost Medal from Poetry Society of America
 2016: Elected an Honorary Fellow of Pembroke College, Cambridge
 2018: PEN/Voelcker Award for Poetry
 2020: Bocas Henry Swanzy Award for Distinguished Service to Caribbean Letters

Selected works

Four Plays for Primary Schools (1964)
Odale's Choice (1967)
Rights of Passage (1967)
Masks (1968)
Islands (1969)
Folk Culture of the Slaves in Jamaica (1970)
The Development of Creole Society in Jamaica, 1770–1820 (1971)
The Arrivants: A New World Trilogy (Rights of Passage; Islands; Masks) (1973)
Contradictory Omens: Cultural Diversity and Integration in the Caribbean (1974)
Other Exiles 1975. , 
Days & Nights (Caldwell, 1975)
Black + Blues 1976. , 
Mother Poem (1977)
Soweto (1979)
History of the Voice (1979)
Jamaica Poetry (1979)
Barbados Poetry (1979)
Sun Poem (1982)
Afternoon of the Status Crow (1982)
Gods of the Middle Passage (1982)
Third World Poems (1983)
History of the Voice: The Development of Nation Language in Anglophone Caribbean Poetry (1984)
Jah Music (1986)
X/Self (1987)
Sappho Sakyi's Meditations (1989)
Shar (1992)
Middle Passages (1992)
The Zea Mexican Diary: 7 September 1926 – 7 September 1986 1993. , 
Trench Town Rock (1993)
Barabajan Poems (1994)
DreamStories (1994)
Dream Haiti (Savacou North, 1995)
Words Need Love Too (2000)  
Ancestors (New Directions, 2001). , 
Magical Realism (2002)
Golokwati (2002)
Born to Slow Horses (2006), Middletown, Conn.: Wesleyan University Press. ,  (winner of the 2006 International Griffin Poetry Prize)
Limbo. As published in Oxford AQA GCSE English Anthology, 2005 and 2008
 
Strange Fruit (Peepal Tree Press, 2016). , 
Liviticus (2017). , 
The Lazarus Poems (2017). ,

Translations

[Fr] Kamau Brathwaite,  / The Visibility Trigger, traduction par Maria-Francesca Mollica et Christine Pagnoulle, Louvain: Cahiers de Louvain, 1986. 
[Es] Kamau Brathwaite, Los danzantes del tiempo: antología poética, selección, introducción y entrevista, Christopher Winks; versión en español Adriana González Mateos y Christopher Winks, México: Universidad Autónoma de la Ciudad de México, 2009.
[Es] Kamau Brathwaite, La unidad submarina: ensayos caribeños, Selección, estudio preliminar y entrevista de Florencia Bonfiglio, Buenos Aires: Katatay, 2010.
[It] Kamau Brathwaite, "Retamar", "Word-Making Man", "The New Year Midnight Poems", "Nest", "Calabash", "Song", cura e traduzione di Andrea Gazzoni, La Rivista dell'Arte, 2:2 (2012), 168–212.1
[Fr] Kamau Brathwaite, RêvHaïti, traduction par Christine Pagnoulle, Montréal: Mémoire d'Encrier, 2013. 
[It] Kamau Brathwaite, Diritti di passaggio, cura e traduzione di Andrea Gazzoni, Rome: Ensemble Edizioni, 2014.
[It] Kamau Brathwaite, "Missile e capsula", in Andrea Gazzoni, Pensiero caraibico: Kamau Brathwaite, Alejo Carpentier, Édouard Glissant, Derek Walcott, Rome: Ensemble Edizioni, 2016.

Critical writing about Brathwaite

Emily Allen Williams, The Critical Response to Kamau Brathwaite. Praeger, 2004.
Timothy J. Reiss. For The Geography of A Soul: Emerging Perspectives on Kamau Brathwaite. Africa World Press, 2002.
Kelly Baker Josephs, "Versions of X/Self: Kamau Brathwaite's Caribbean Discourse", Anthurium: A Caribbean Studies Journal, 1.1 (Fall 2003).
June Bobb, Beating a Restless Drum: The Poetics of Kamau Brathwaite and Derek Walcott. Trenton, NJ: Africa World Press, 1997.
ed. Stewart Brown. The Art of Kamau Brathwaite (Seren, 1995).
Loretta Collins, "From the 'Crossroads of Space' to the (dis)Koumforts of Home: Radio and the Poet as Transmuter of the Word in Kamau Brathwaite's 'Meridian' and Ancestors", Anthurium, 1.1 (Fall 2003).
Raphael Dalleo, "Another 'Our America': Rooting a Caribbean Aesthetic in the Work of José Martí, Kamau Brathwaite and Édouard Glissant", Anthurium, 2.2 (Fall 2004). 
Montague Kobbe, "Caribbean Identity and Nation Language in Kamau Brathwaite", Latineos, 23 December 2010. Retrieved 18 October 2012. 
Melanie Otto, A Creole Experiment: Utopian Space in Kamau Brathwaite's "Video-Style" Works. Trenton, NJ: Africa World Press, 2009.
Anna Reckin, "Tidalectic Lectures: Kamau Brathwaite's Prose/Poetry as Sound-Space", Anthurium, 1.1 (Fall 2003).
Andrew Rippeon, "Bebop, Broadcast, Podcast, Audioglyph: Scanning Kamau Brathwaite's Mediated Sounds", Contemporary Literature, 55.2 (Summer 2014).

See also

 Caribbean literature
 Caribbean poetry
 Nation language
 Postcolonial literature

References

External links
 
 The Ocean’s Tide: Parentheses in Kamau Brathwaite’s and Nathaniel Mackey’s Decolonial Poetics at Cordite Poetry Review
Griffin Poetry Prize biography
Griffin Poetry Prize reading, including video clip
OOM Gallery Archive / Photograph of Edward Kamau Brathwaite in Birmingham, United Kingdom, 1980s
 (video)
Several articles by Brathwaite in CARIFESTA and Tapia from the Digital Library of the Caribbean
"Retamar", "Word-Making Man", "The New Year Midnight Poems", "Nest", Calabash", "Song" – English/Italian version in La Rivista dell'Arte, 2/2, pp. 168–212.
Kamau Brathwaite (Edward Brathwaite) sound recordings from PennSound Center for Programs in Contemporary Writing at the University of Pennsylvania
Crowdsourced Kamau Brathwaite Zotero Bibliography
Kamau Brathwaite, Poet Who Celebrated Caribbean Culture, Dies at 89, The New York Times, 17 February 2020.
St. Martin cultural activists/writers attend Kamau Brathwaite’s funeral in Barbados. The Daily Herald, 25 February 2020.
"Negus - a tribute to Kamau Brathwaite (R.I.P.)" by Linton Kwesi Johnson, February 2020.

1930 births
2020 deaths
Barbadian poets
Male poets
Afro-Barbadian
Barbadian male writers
Alumni of Pembroke College, Cambridge
Alumni of the University of Sussex
New York University faculty
University of the West Indies academics
People from Bridgetown
People educated at Harrison College (Barbados)
Recipients of the Musgrave Medal
Barbadian academics
Barbados in World War II
20th-century poets
21st-century poets
20th-century male writers
21st-century male writers
Caribbean Artists Movement people
Fulbright alumni